Gutierre de Vargas Carvajal (1506–1559) was a Roman Catholic prelate who served as Bishop of Plasencia (1524–1559).

Biography
Gutierre de Vargas Carvajal born in Madrid in 1506. On 25 May 1524, he was appointed during the papacy of Pope Clement VII as Bishop of Plasencia. He was a great builder of churches, organizer of ecclesiastical administration, and a patron of the arts.  He financed a maritime expedition crossing the Straits of Magellan, and his intended purpose was to colonize and evangelize Patagonia. He served as Bishop of Plasencia until his death on 27 April 1559. 
He died in Jaraicejo (province of Cáceres), but was buried in Madrid.

While bishop, he was the principal co-consecrator of Fernando Valdés, Bishop of Elne (1529).

References

External links and additional sources
 (for Chronology of Bishops)  
 (for Chronology of Bishops) 

16th-century Roman Catholic bishops in Spain
1506 births
1559 deaths
Burials in Madrid